Naked SNCTM is a Showtime television docuseries about the Snctm sex club.

References

External links

American documentary television series
2017 American television series debuts
Swinging (sexual practice)